There have been several major fires in post-Soviet Baku, Azerbaijan:

 1995 Baku Metro fire - 289 people killed
 2015 Baku residence building fire - 15 people killed
 2018 Baku fire - 26 people killed